These initials may also mean the American College of Medical Genetics.

The Association of Canadian Mountain Guides (ACMG) is Canada's only internationally recognised mountain guide association.  The association has over 1400 members, and coordinates internationally recognised training and certification programmes.

The ACMG is a registered non-profit society with an elected, volunteer executive. The association and its activities are funded primarily by membership dues and donations.

History
The ACMG was formed in 1963 with the encouragement of Parks Canada.  In 1972, the ACMG became the first non European member of the International Federation of Mountain Guides Associations (IFMGA), the international body that sets professional standards for mountain guides worldwide.

External links
 The official ACMG web site

Professional associations based in Canada
Mountain guides associations
Mountaineering in Canada